Philometridae is a family of nematodes belonging to the order Rhabditida. All Philometridae are obligate tissue parasites of fish.

Life cycle
Philometridae cycle between two hosts: Cyclopoida (small crustaceans) as an intermediate host, and various fish as a definitive host. First-stage larvae are ejected into the water, and develop to the third stage if they're eaten by a cyclopoid. Once the copepod is eaten by a fish, the larvae develop into adults and mate. Pregnant females migrate to a final site just under the fish's skin, in the swim bladder, or in the coelom; males die soon after mating and in many Philometridae species they have never been described.

Genera
 Afrophilometra Moravec, Charo-Karisa & Jirků, 2009
Alinema Rasheed, 1963
Barracudia Moravec & Shamsi, 2017
Buckleyella Rasheed, 1963
Caranginema Moravec, Montoya-Mendoza & Salgado-Maldonado, 2008
Clavinema Yamaguti, 1935
Clavinemoides Moravec, Khosheghbal & Pazooki, 2013
Congerinema Moravec, Nagasawa, Nitta & Tawa, 2019
Dentiphilometra Moravec & Wang, 2002
Dentirumai Quiazon & Moravec, 2012
Digitiphilometroides Moravec & Barton, 2018
Margolisianum Blaylock & Overstreet, 1999
Neophilometroides Moravec, Salgado-Maldonado & Aguilar-Aguila, 2002
Nilonema Khalil, 1960
Paraphilometroides Moravec & Shaharom-Harrison, 1989
Philometra Costa, 1845
Philometroides Yamaguti, 1935
''Phlyctainophora Steiner, 1921
Piscinema
Rumai Travassos, 1960
Spirophilometra Parukhin, 1971

References

Nematodes